Ardell is a name which can serve as a given name and as a surname.

Notable people with the given name:
Ardell Brede (born 1939), American politician
Shirley Ardell Mason (1923–1998), American psychiatric patient and art teacher
Ardell Wiegandt (born 1940), American/Canadian football coach
Notable people with the surname:
Dan Ardell (born 1941), American baseball player
James MacArdell (1729?–1765), Irish engraver of mezzotints

See also
The Ardells, there have been several bands called the Ardells